Janakeeya Kodathi is a 1985 Indian Malayalam film, directed by Hassan and produced by Areefa Hassan. The film stars Madhu, Srividya, Prameela and Ratheesh in the lead roles. The film has musical score by A. T. Ummer.

Cast
Madhu
Srividya
Prameela
Ratheesh
Sukumaran
Bhagyalakshmi (actress)
Rahman
Seema

Soundtrack
The music was composed by A. T. Ummer and the lyrics were written by Cheramangalam.

References

External links
 

1985 films
1980s Malayalam-language films
Films scored by A. T. Ummer